"Arabian riff", also known as "The Streets of Cairo", "The Poor Little Country Maid", and "the snake charmer song", is a well-known melody, published in various forms in the nineteenth century. Alternate titles for children's songs using this melody include "The Girls in France" and "The Southern Part of France". This song is often associated with the hoochie coochie belly dance.

History 

Colin prend sa hotte appears to derive from the lost Kradoudja, an Algerian folk song of the seventeenth century.

A version of the riff was published in 1845 by Franz Hünten as Melodie Arabe. The melody was described as an "Arabian Song" in the La grande méthode complète de cornet à piston et de saxhorn par Arban, first published in the 1850s.

Sol Bloom, a showman (and later a U.S. congressman), published the song as the entertainment director of the World's Columbian Exposition in 1893. It included an attraction called "A Street in Cairo" produced by Gaston Akoun, which featured snake charmers, camel rides and a scandalous dancer known as Little Egypt. Songwriter James Thornton penned the words and music to his own version of this melody, "Streets Of Cairo or The Poor Little Country Maid". Copyrighted in 1895, it was made popular by his wife Lizzie Cox, who used the stage name Bonnie Thornton. The oldest known recording of the song is from 1895, performed by Dan Quinn (Berliner Discs 171-Z).

The melody is often heard when something that is connected with Arabia, Persia (Iran), India, Egypt, deserts, belly dancing or snake charming is being shown.

The song was also recorded as "They Don't Wear Pants in the Southern Part of France" by John Bartles, the version sometimes played by radio host Dr. Demento.

Travadja La Moukère
In France, there is a popular song which pieds-noirs from Algeria brought back in the 1960s called "Travadja La Moukère" (from trabaja la mujer, which means "the woman works" in Spanish), which uses the same Hoochy Coochy tune. Its original tune, said to have been based on an original Arab song, was created around 1850 and subsequently adopted by the Foreign Legion.

Partial lyrics:

In popular culture

Music
Since the piece is not copyrighted, it has been used as a basis for numerous songs, especially in the early 20th century:
 "Hoolah! Hoolah!"
 "Dance of the Midway"
 "Coochi-Coochi Polka"
 "Danse Du Ventre"
 "In My Harem" by Irving Berlin
 "Kutchy Kutchy"
 ''Strut, Miss Lizzie'' by Creamer and Layton
 In Italy, the melody is often sung with the words "Te ne vai o no? Te ne vai sì o no?" ("Are you leaving or not? Are you leaving, yes or no?"). That short tune is used to invite an annoying person to move along, or at least to shut up.
 In 1934, during the Purim festivities in Tel Aviv, the song received Hebrew lyrics jokingly referring to the Book of Esther and its characters (Ahasaurus, Vashti, Haman and Esther) written by Natan Alterman, Israel's foremost lyricist of the time. It was performed by the "Matateh" troupe, under the name "נעמוד בתור / Na'amod Bator" ("we will stand in line").

1900s
 "Scherzo for String Quartet" by Charles Ives (1904)

1920s
 "Sweet mamma (Papa's getting mad)" by Original Dixieland Jass Band (1920)
 The "Little Egypt" segment of the World's Columbian Exposition scene in Show Boat (1927)
 "Tight Like This" by Louis Armstrong and His Hot Five (1928)

1930s
 "Twilight in Turkey" by the Raymond Scott Quintette (1937)

1940s
 This tune is quoted in Luther Billis' dance in "Honey Bun" from the musical South Pacific. (1949)
 "Bonaparte's Retreat" by Pee Wee King (1949)

1950s
 "Istanbul (Not Constantinople)" by The Four Lads (1953) and They Might Be Giants (1990)
 "Native Dancer" by Abner Silver and Al Hoffman, recorded by Rusty Draper (1953)
 "Nellie the Elephant" by Ralph Butler (1956)
 "Teenager's Mother (Are You Right?)" by Bill Haley & His Comets (1956)
 "Ek Ladki Bheegi Bhaagi Si" from the motion picture Chalti Ka Naam Gaadi (1958)
 "Oriental Rock" by Bill Haley & His Comets (1958)

1960s
 "The Sheik of Araby" performed by the Beatles during their 1962 Decca audition, with George Harrison as the lead singer and Pete Best on the drums (this track can be found on Anthology 1).
 "Egyptian Surf" by The Temptations (New York vocal group) (1963)
 "I've Got the Skill" by Jackie Ross (US #89, 1964)
 "Revolution 9" by the Beatles (1968)
 "Funky Mule" by Buddy Miles Express (1968)

1970s
 "The Grand Wazoo" by Frank Zappa (1972)
 "Sharon" by David Bromberg (1972)
 "Uragiri No Machikado (裏切りの街角)" by Kai Band (甲斐バンド) (1975)
 "Pra Lá de Bagdá" by The Fevers (1975)
 "You Scared the Lovin' Outta Me" by Funkadelic (1976)
 "Open Sesame" by Kool & the Gang (1976)
 "One for the Vine" by Genesis (1976)
 "Egyptian Reggae" by Jonathan Richman and the Modern Lovers (1977)
 "King Tut" by Steve Martin (1978)
 "White Cigarettes" by P-Model (1979)

1980s
 "Menergy" by Patrick Cowley (1981)
 "Lies," by Thompson Twins, immediately after the line, "Cleopatra died for Egypt. What a waste of time!" (1982)
 "Monster" by Fred Schneider (1984)
 "Starchild" by Teena Marie (1984)
 "Egypt, Egypt" by Egyptian Lover (1984)
"Jail House Rap" by The Fat Boys (1984)

1990s
 "Iesha" by Another Bad Creation (1990)
 "Place in France" by L.A.P.D. (1991)
 "Gypsy Reggae" by Goran Bregović (1993)
 "Cleopatra, Queen of Denial" by Pam Tillis (1993)
 "Cleopatra's Cat" by the Spin Doctors (1994)
 "Whiney Whiney (What Really Drives Me Crazy)" by Willi One Blood (1994)
 "The Short-Tempered Clavier and other dysfunctional works for keyboard" by Peter Schickele (1995)
 "Skatanic" by Reel Big Fish (1996)
 "Chance to Farewell" (헤어지는 기회) by So Chan-whee (소찬휘) (1996)
 "Criminal" by Fiona Apple (1997)
 "Hokus Pokus" by Insane Clown Posse (1997)
 "Rip Rock" by Canibus (1998)
 "Illusion" by Destiny's Child (1998)
 "Circus" (马戏团) by David Tao (陶喆) (1999)

2000s
 "Playboy" by Red Wanting Blue (2000)
 "Migdalit" by Nurit Hirsch (2002)
 "Learn Chinese" by MC Jin (欧阳靖) (2003)
 "Over There" by Jonathan Coulton (2003) (lyrics)
 "Act a Ass" by E-40 (2003)
 "The Treasures of Ancient Egypt" by The Backyardigans (2004)
 "Lækker pt. 2 feat. L.O.C." Nik & Jay (2004)
 "Would You Be My Girlfriend (你愿意做我女友吗)" by The Flowers (花儿乐队) (2004)
 "Naggin" by Ying Yang Twins (2005)
 "Toc Toc Toc" by Lee Hyori (이효리) (2007)
 "Killer (杀手)" by Lin Junjie (林俊杰) (2007)
 "Till You Come to Me" by Spencer Day (2009)
 "¿Viva la Gloria? (Little Girl)" by Green Day (2009)

2010s
 "Space Girl" by The Imagined Village (2010)
 "Take It Off" by Kesha (2010)
 "Who's That? Broooown!" by Das Racist (2010)
 "Grunt Tube" by Blue Water White Death (2010)
 "Spy (间谍)" by Silence Wong (汪苏泷) (2010)
 "Shotgun" by Limp Bizkit (2011)
 "Lipstick" by Orange Caramel (2012)
 "ÆØÅ (Size Matters)" by Kollektivet (2012)
 "I'm Not In Your Mind" by King Gizzard & the Lizard Wizard (2014)
 "Gloryhole" by Steel Panther (2014)
 "Hypnotic" by Zella Day (2015)
 "Back On The Train" by Phish (7/22/2015, Bend OR)
  "Music to Watch Boys To" by Lana Del Rey (2015)
 "Genghis Khan" by Miike Snow (2015)
 "Bay of Pigs" by Civil War (2015)
 "We Appreciate Power" by Grimes (2018)
 "Hide Out" (사라지는 꿈) by Sultan of the Disco (2018)
 "I'm So Hot" by Momoland (2019)

2020s
 "Tantrum" by Ashnikko (2020)
 "Mago" by GFriend (2020)
 "Lovelife" by Benny Benassi feat. Jeremih (2020)
 "Broke N****s" by City Girls feat. Yo Gotti (2020)
 "Vermelho" by Gloria Groove (2022)
 "Benny's Got A Gun" by BLK ODYSSY feat. Benny the Butcher and George Clinton (2022)
 "What are you doing here?" from The Walten Files Soundtrack (2020)

Cartoons
 Felix the Cat: Arabiantics (1928)
 Mickey Mouse: The Opry House (1929)
 Mickey Mouse: The Karnival Kid (1929)
 Mickey Mouse: The Chain Gang (1930)
 Mickey Mouse: Pioneer Days (1930)
 Mickey Mouse: Mickey Steps Out (1931)
 Circus Capers (1930)
 Betty Boop: Boop-Oop-a-Doop (1932)
 Flip the Frog: Circus (1932)
 Goofy Goat Antics (1933)
 Mickey Mouse: The Band Concert (1935)
 Mickey Mouse: Magician Mickey (1937)
 Mickey Mouse: Clock Cleaners (1937)
 Donald Duck: Self Control (1938)
 Donald Duck: The Autograph Hound (1939)
 Goofy and Wilbur (1939)
 Goofy Groceries (1940)
 Porky Pig: Ali-Baba Bound (1940)
 Bugs Bunny: What's Cookin' Doc? (1944)
 Private Snafu: Booby Traps (1944)
 "Dog, Cat and Canary" (1945)
 Aladdin's Lamp (1947)
 Popeye "Nurse to Meet Ya" (1955)
 Woody Woodpecker: Witch Crafty (1955)
 Woody Woodpecker: Roamin' Roman (1963)
 Vincent (1982)
 The Simpsons episode "Homer's Night Out" (1990)
 Kirby: Right Back at Ya! episode "Caterpillar Thriller" (2003, Japanese version only)
 JoJo's Circus – used as the melody of the "Snake Dance" song (2003)
 The Adventures of Jimmy Neutron, Boy Genius episode "Beach Party Mummy" (2003)
 The Backyardigans episode "Secret Mission" (2004)
 Dave the Barbarian episode "Floral Derangement" (2004)
 The Simpsons episode "Milhouse Doesn't Live Here Anymore" (2004)
 King of the Hill episode "SerPunt" (2007)
 "Super Fast!!" episode Little Einsteins (2007)
 Bob's Burgers episode "Uncle Teddy" (2014)
 Family Guy episode "Switch the Flip" (2018)
 Disenchantment (season 2) opening credits (2019)
Big Mouth Season 5, Episode 1 (2021)
Smiling Friends Season 1, Episode 3 (2022)

Computer games
From cartoons the song has been adapted to video games. It appears on following computer and video games:
 Dark Tower (1981 electronic game, bazaar)
 Venture (1981)
 Oh Mummy (1984)
 Bombo (1986)
 Rick Dangerous (1989, Level 2 – Egypt)
 Quest for Glory II: Trial by Fire (1990, Katta's Tail Inn)
 Spot: The Video Game! (1990, when adding a piece to the right)
 Pyramid and Pyramid II (1990, first level)
 Lotus Turbo Challenge 1 (1991, desert level)
 Jill of the Jungle (1992)
 The Lost Vikings (1992, Level 3 – Egypt)
 Lemmings 2 (1993, Egyptian tribe)
 Zool 2 (1994, Tooting common level 3)
 Rampage Through Time (2000, Egyptian time zone)
 Kirby Mass Attack (2011, "Desert Scorcher" and "Lifted Upward")
 Rayman Origins (2011) Lums Notes Of Desert Of Dijridoos
 Kirby and the Rainbow Curse (2015, "More Dig and Dash" (taken directly from the anime) and "Evade Dig and Dash")
 Cuphead (2017, Pyramid Peril)
 Red Dead Redemption 2 (2018)

Television
 Andy Bernard sings a variation with a sitar in the "Moroccan Christmas" episode of season 5 of The Office.
Tom Ellis as 'Lucifer' plays a part of 'The Streets of Cairo' on the piano in season 4 episode 5.

Film
 In Charles Lamont's 1932 short film War Babies, the first film in the Baby Burlesks series, the song is briefly used while Shirley Temple's character Charmaine is dancing around in Buttermilk Pete's Cafe.
 In Laurel and Hardy's Sons of the Desert (1933), it is heard briefly in a belly dancer scene at the beginning of the convention.
 In The Great Ziegfeld (1936), which won the Best Picture Oscar in 1937, the song is heard as the backdrop to the "Little Egypt" attraction on the Midway of the World's Columbian Exposition run by Billings, a character portrayed by Frank Morgan and loosely based on Sol Bloom.
 It is heard in the beginning of Patrice Leconte's short film "Le laboratoire de l'angoisse" (1971).
 In Emir Kusturica's 1993 movie Arizona Dream, the tune is being played several times with accordion by Grace.

Children's culture
The tune is used for a 20th-century American children's song with – like many unpublished songs of child folk culture – countless variations as the song is passed from child to child over considerable lengths of time and geography, the one constant being that the versions are almost always smutty. One variation, for example, is:
There's a place in France
Where the ladies wear no pants
But the men don't care
'cause they don't wear underwear.
or a similar version:
There's a place in France
Where the naked ladies dance
There's a hole in the wall
Where the boys can see it all.

Another World War II-era variation is as follows:
When your mind goes blank
And you're dying for a wank
And Hitler's playing snooker with your balls
In the German nick
They hang you by your dick
And put dirty pictures on the walls.

See also
 Oriental riff - similar musical motif, often associated with China
 Italian riff

References

External links
 "Streets of Cairo" sheet music in the Levy Collection, via Jscholarship
 
 

Traditional children's songs
Stereotypes
1895 songs
Songs written by James Thornton (songwriter)
Riffs
Songs about Asia